Phosphatidylinositol-4-phosphate 5-kinase type-1 alpha is an enzyme that in humans is encoded by the PIP5K1A gene.

References

Further reading